Megham is a 1999 Indian Malayalam-language comedy-drama film directed by Priyadarshan, written by T. Damodaran, produced by Suresh Balaje and distributed by Mohanlal through Pranavam Movies. It stars Mammootty, Dileep, Priya Gill, Pooja Batra, K. P. A. C. Lalitha, Sreenivasan, Nedumudi Venu, Captain Raju and Cochin Haneefa. The music was composed by Ouseppachan.

Plot
Col. Ravi Varma Thampuran decides to go on leave for two months and travel alone to avoid depression after his wife leaves him. He visits the home village of his subordinate Manikandan, where he finds and eventually falls in love with Meenakshi. He grants divorce to his wife. But later he learns that Meenakshi is engaged to Mani. He then tries to vent his anger on Manikandan. However, after visit by his estranged wife, he realises his mistakes and he then decides to unite the two, resisting opposition from both the families, by faking Meenakshi's suicide. In final scene he can be seen leaving escorted by police and is probably court martialed for preventing Manikandan from leaving along with troops for the war front earlier.

Cast

 Mammootty as Lieutenant Colonel Ravi Varma Thampuran / Kelan
 Dileep as Sepoy E. Manikandan Nair / Mani
 Priya Gill as Meenakshi, Mani's cousin
 Sreenivasan as Shanmughan
 Pooja Batra as Swathy, Ravi's divorcée
 K. P. A. C. Lalitha as Aachamma, Mani and Meenakshi's grandmother
 Mamukkoya as Kurup, Ravi's assistant / manager
 Nedumudi Venu as Kumaran, Meenakshi's father
 Cochin Haneefa as Kunjikuttan, Kumaran's younger brother
 T. R. Omana as Thampuran's mother
 Manka Mahesh as Aachamma's daughter and Manikandan's mother
 Venu Nagavally as Colonel Sunny
 Major Ravi as Major Jeevan
 James Stalin as Ayyappan, Kumaran's brother
 Sindhu as Manikandan's sister
 Ajayan Adoor as Govindankutty, Sindhu's husband
 Captain Raju as Brigadier Santhosh, Swathy's father
 Vijayan Peringode as Chandrashekharan, Panchayat President 
 Augustine as Govindan Nair

Songs

References

External links 
 

1990s Malayalam-language films
1999 films
Indian musical comedy-drama films
Films with screenplays by T. Damodaran
Films shot in Ooty
Films shot in Pollachi
Films shot in Palakkad
1990s musical comedy-drama films
Films directed by Priyadarshan
1999 comedy films
1999 drama films
Films scored by Ouseppachan